This List of tallest buildings in Tucson ranks high-rises from a starting point of at least  tall, based on standard height measurement. This measurement includes architectural details (such as spires), but this does not include Radio masts and towers. Currently the tallest building in Tucson, Arizona is One South Church at  completed in 1986.

List

Approved, Proposed, Under Construction or Cancelled
Under Construction

References

External links

Tallest Skyscrapers in Tucson-Emporis.com

Tallest in Tucson
Tucson